Heteropiidae is a family of sea sponges in the order Leucosolenida in the class Calcarea.  In a 2012 paper, Oliver Voigt, Eilika Wülfing and Gert Wörheide (2012) confirmed that the family Heteropiidae is not monophyletic./

References

Leucosolenida
Taxa named by Arthur Dendy